BitMEX is a cryptocurrency exchange and derivative trading platform. It is owned and operated by HDR Global Trading Limited, which is registered in the Seychelles.

BitMEX offers a variety of cryptocurrency-based financial products, including perpetual contracts, futures contracts, and options contracts. These products allow traders to bet on the price movements of cryptocurrencies like Bitcoin, Ethereum, and others, without actually owning the underlying assets.

History
BitMEX was founded in 2014 by Arthur Hayes, Ben Delo, and Samuel Reed, with financing from family and friends.
Bitmex completed a SAFE round of investment in July 2015 then shortly after was inducted into SOSV batch 8 china accelerator program where it sold equity in exchange for labour and financing.

In 2016, the exchange introduced perpetual futures, which became its most popular derivative product.
 In 2018, Delo became the United Kingdom's first billionaire from bitcoin, and its youngest self-made billionaire.

In July 2019, Nouriel Roubini, a critic of cryptocurrencies, suggested that the exchange is involved in illegal activities, allowing traders to take on too much risk and by trading against clients. Two days later, it was reported by Bloomberg that the Commodity Futures Trading Commission (CFTC) was investigating BitMEX as to whether they broke rules by allowing Americans to trade on the platform.

On October 1, 2020, Hayes, Reed, Delo, and Gregory Dwyer were indicted on charges of violating the U.S. Bank Secrecy Act and conspiracy to violate that law, arising from allegations that the four failed to implement anti-money laundering measures. The case name is "U.S. v. Hayes et al", case number of 20-cr-00500, in the U.S. District Court for the Southern District of New York.

On April 6, 2021, former BitMEX CEO Arthur Hayes turned himself in to face U.S. charges for violating the Bank Secrecy Act. He was released on $10 million bond pending future court proceedings in New York.

On February 24, 2022, Delo and Hayes pled guilty to violating the Bank Secrecy Act by willfully failing to establish, implement, and maintain an anti-money laundering program at BitMEX. The pair agreed to separately pay a $10 million criminal fine representing pecuniary gain derived from the offense.

On March 9, 2022, Reed pleaded guilty to violating the Bank Secrecy Act and agreed to pay a $10 million criminal fine. Reed faces a maximum of five years in prison when he’s sentenced by U.S. District Court Judge John George Koeltl in New York. Gregory Dwyer’s trial is scheduled for October 2022.

On May 20, 2022, Hayes was sentenced to two years' probation, with home confinement for six months.

On June 15, 2022, Delo was sentenced to 30 months' probation and as a UK citizen returned to Hong Kong subsequently to serve his probation.

References

Bitcoin exchanges
Bitcoin companies
Companies of Seychelles
Digital currency exchanges